Daniel Blomgren (born 23 August 1982 in Ulricehamn) is a Swedish football player, who currently plays for IK Sirius of Division 1 Norra.

Notes

External links 
 

1983 births
Living people
Swedish footballers
GAIS players
FK Bodø/Glimt players
Swedish expatriate footballers
Expatriate footballers in Norway
Swedish expatriate sportspeople in Norway
IK Sirius Fotboll players
Association football defenders